Hayton is an unincorporated community in the town of Charlestown, Calumet County, Wisconsin, United States. It is located a few miles (kilometers) east of Chilton at the intersection of U.S. Route 151 and County T.

Location

The Killsnake River, a fork of the Manitowoc River, flows eastward through the community. It is dammed by a mill and the sediments have been contaminated by PCBs.

History
Hayton was the first settlement on the Killsnake River. It was settled in the 1840s by William Urmston and it was originally named Wallersville after one of the landowners before it was renamed Hayton.

Notable people
Jeremiah Wallace Baldock, Wisconsin State Assemblyman and farmer, lived in Hayton.
William D. Carroll, Wisconsin State Senator, was born in Hayton.

References

Unincorporated communities in Calumet County, Wisconsin
Unincorporated communities in Wisconsin